The State University of New York at Farmingdale (Farmingdale State College or SUNY Farmingdale) is a public college in East Farmingdale, New York. It is part of the State University of New York. The college was chartered in 1912 as a school of applied agriculture under the name of New York State School Of Agriculture on Long Island. As of the fall semester of 2016, Farmingdale State College had an enrollment of 9,237.

History
The State University of New York at Farmingdale was founded in 1912 as the New York State School of Agriculture on Long Island. The founding of the college was originally proposed by State Assemblyman John Lupton in 1909. Lupton Hall, which houses the departments of Chemistry and Physics as well the School of Engineering Technology, now bears his name.

Two of the oldest buildings on campus are Hicks Hall and Cutler Hall, which were constructed in 1914 and were originally called the Horticulture and Agronomy Buildings, respectively. The buildings house four oil on canvas murals, painted in 1936 by local artists Frederick Marshall and C. E. Lessing as a part of the Works Progress Administration. The murals depict agricultural scenes, including wheat-threshing, rice harvesting, and cotton picking.

Ward Hall, also constructed in 1914, was the original dormitory and now houses College offices, including Alumni Relations and Business Outreach. When the college first admitted students in March 1916, Ward Hall was not yet completed. Students slept instead in temporary quarters on the upper level of Conklin Hall, which was then the physical plant.

Theodore Roosevelt Jr. delivered the address at the college's second commencement exercises on May 26, 1920. That same year, the school changed its name for the first time, becoming the New York State School Of Applied Agriculture on Long Island. 

Later historical buildings include Knapp Hall, completed in 1937, and Thompson Hall, competed in 1938, which were each built in the Georgian Colonial style.

A Memorial Oak was planted on June 4, 1921, to honor American soldiers killed in World War I. The Oak was planted in soil collected from all 48 states as well as from the allied nations from the war. A plaque gifted by the Class of 1927 rests at the base of the oak and reads:

“This Oak, Planted June 4, 1921, Commemorates The Efforts, Sacrifices And Achievements Of All Americans Who Gave Their Lives In The World War.

“Its Roots Rest in Soil From All The Allied Nations, From Every State And Dependency Of Our Country, From The Bloody Angle Of Gettysburg And From The Arc De Triomphe Of France.

“On Fames Eternal Camping-Ground Their Silent Tents Are Spread, And Glory Guards With Solemn Round The Bivouac Of The Dead.”

The school's name would change seven more times before its current name was adopted in 1993; these changes included the State Institute Of Applied Agriculture (1924), State Institute Of Agriculture (1939), Long Island Agricultural and Technical Institute (1946), SUNY Long Island Agricultural and Technical Institute at Farmingdale (1953), Agricultural and Technical College at Farmingdale (1966), and SUNY College of Technology at Farmingdale (1987).

Academics
Farmingdale offers more than 45 academic programs under the authority of one of four schools:
School of Engineering Technology 
School of Business 
School of Health Sciences
School of Arts & Sciences

Research centers
Renewable Energy and Sustainability Center 
Solar Energy Center 
Applied Mathematics Center 
Social Science Research Institute
Protect New York
Infrastructure, Transportation and Security Center

Student-body profile 
 Enrollment of more than 9,500 students (2016–2017)
 Student body is 30% minority: 17% Hispanic and 10% African American
 600 resident students
 122 international students

Campus
The campus spans over 380 acres and more than 30 buildings. Farmingdale State College is primarily a commuter school, but does offer residence halls.

Its Solar Energy Center is the first center to be accredited in the Northeast and the fourth in the nation, and Farmingdale has a federally funded Green Building Institute, an electric-fuel-powered campus fleet, a charging station, and a Smart Energy House. The Campus Center also features an energy-efficient roofing structure.

Athletics

Farmingdale State College teams participate as a member of the National Collegiate Athletic Association's Division III and is a member of the Skyline Conference. The Intercollegiate Athletic Program supports and expands the total educational experience offered by the college. The program serves as a laboratory for the education of the student-athlete, and is conducted in keeping with the general educational mission of the college. Men's sports include baseball, basketball, cross country, golf, lacrosse, soccer, tennis and track & field; while women's sports include basketball, cross country, lacrosse, soccer, softball, tennis, track & field and volleyball.

Notable alumni
Fernando Caldeiro - NASA astronaut; graduated with degree in aerospace technology
 Michael DenDekker – Member of the New York State Assembly from the 34th district
 Sal DeVito - Advertising executive and co-founder of the DeVito/Verdi advertising agency
DJ Richie Rich – Member of the rap trio 3rd Bass
 William Fichtner – Actor
Roy Gussow – Abstract sculptor 
 Ryan LaFlare – Retired professional mixed martial arts fighter
 John Romita Jr. – Comic-book illustrator
William N. Valavanis – Bonsai master
Clyde Vanel – Assembly member for the 33rd District of the New York State Assembly
Len Wein – Comic-book writer and editor
Fred Hembeck – Cartoonist
 John Brooks – Member of the New York State Senate from the 8th district
 Larry G. Ciancio – Founding Chairman of Motorsports Hall of Fame of America
 Daniel Simone – Author
 Richard Conrad – Opera singer

See also

 List of colleges and universities in New York
 List of State University of New York units

References

External links
Official website
Official athletics website

 
1912 establishments in New York (state)
Babylon (town), New York
Educational institutions established in 1912
Universities and colleges in Suffolk County, New York
Universities and colleges on Long Island
Farmingdale State College